is an underground metro station located in Kanagawa-ku, Yokohama, Kanagawa, Japan operated by the Yokohama Municipal Subway’s Blue Line (Line 3). It is 24.8 kilometers from the terminus of the Blue Line at Shōnandai Station.

History
Misuzawa-kamichō Station was opened on March 14, 1985. Platform screen doors were installed in April 2007.

Lines
Yokohama Municipal Subway
Blue Line

Station layout
Misuzawa-kamichō Station has a dual opposed side platforms serving two tracks, located five stories underground.  The station was constructed at a depth of  using the NATM method, with rounded tunnels unusual for Japanese metro systems.

Platforms

Surrounding area
 Yokohama National University
 Mitsuzawa Park and Mitsuzawa Stadium
 Yokohama Municipal Hospital
 Bugenji Temple
 Mitsuzawa Cemetery
 Kanagawa Prefectural Yokohama Suiran High School
 Mitsuzawa Nursery School(Mitsuzawa Hoikuen)

References
 Harris, Ken and Clarke, Jackie. Jane's World Railways 2008-2009. Jane's Information Group (2008).

External links
 Mitsuzawa-kamichō Station (Blue Line) 

Railway stations in Kanagawa Prefecture
Railway stations in Japan opened in 1985
Blue Line (Yokohama)